Truskava Eldership is a Lithuanian eldership, located in the north eastern part of Kėdainiai District Municipality.

Geography
The territory of Truskava Eldership is located mostly in the Nevėžis Plain. Relief is mostly flat, cultivated as agriculture lands. 

 Rivers: Linkava, Žiežmojus.
 Lakes and ponds: Paežeriai Lake.
 Marches: Laukagalis March
 Forests: Pauslajys Forest, Lančiūnava-Šventybrastis Forest.
 Protected areas: Gaisai Botanical Zoological Sanctuary, Dovydai Forest Botanical Sanctuary, Pašilėliai Botanical Zoological Sanctuary, Skaistė Ornitological Sanctuary.

Places of interest
Catholic churches in Truskava and Anciškis
Pavermenys manor
Pauslajys manor site
Šukioniai hillfort

Populated places 
Following settlements are located in the Truskava Eldership (as for the 2011 census):

Towns: Truskava 
Villages: Anciškis · Bajoriškiai · Daugėliškis · Dvariškiai I · Dvariškiai II · Gaisai · Gerdvilai · Kievagalis · Kušleikiškis · Lalai · Lasongalis · Laukagalis · Likėnai · Naujasodė · Okainėliai · Okainiai · Osinauka · Oželiai · Padėgiai · Padvarninkai · Paežeriai · Pagilupys · Pašilėliai · Pauslajys ·  Pavermenys · Petkūnai · Piktagalis · Pročiūnai · Ramygolka · Ratlankstis · Rekšiai · Suradgalis · Ščiukiškis · Šnipiškis · Šukioniai · Taujankai · Taujėnai · Trakai ·  Užvalkiai · Užvermenė · Užžartėlė · Vaidilai · Vidulaukiai · Volungiškiai

References

Elderships in Kėdainiai District Municipality